"Moliendo Café" ("Grinding Coffee") is a Venezuelan song that has become popular around the world. The song was written in 1958, but the authorship is disputed between Hugo Blanco and his uncle José Manzo Perroni. Blanco's recording in 1961 became No. 1 in Argentina, and it has since been recorded by many singers. The song has also become a common football chant around the world as "Dale Cavese".

Composition and recordings
According to Hugo Blanco, he composed the song in 1958, and since he was not of age (he was 17 years old), he asked his uncle José Manzo Perroni to register the work for him at the Sociedad de Autores y Compositores de Venezuela (SACVEN). A few years later, Perroni sued Blanco for appropriating the work, claiming that it was he who composed the song, and that his nephew had stolen the melody.

The lyrics of the song tells of someone who, while grinding coffee at night, feels frustrated at having to work instead of having a love life.

The first singer to record "Moliendo Café" was Mario Suárez in 1958; Blanco did not record it himself until 1961. Blanco's version hit No. 1 in Argentina and Japan that year.

Cover versions
Cuban singer Xiomara Alfaro's Spanish-language version peaked at No. 1 in Peru. Lucho Gatica's version of the song peaked at No. 3 in Spain. Mina's version topped the Italian singles chart and was the No. 11 track on the end-of-year chart in 1962.

Julio Iglesias covered the song in the 1976 for his album America, which led to renewed interest. Mario Suárez covered the song in his 2002 album Moliendo Café.

At present, the song has more than 800 versions in many languages. "Coffee Rumba" has been covered by several Japanese artists such as The Peanuts, Yōko Oginome, and Yōsui Inoue. In Indonesia, the song is titled "Kopi Dangdut" and was a hit in that country in 1991. Ricardo Montaner performed a cover of the song on his 2001 album Sueño Repetido.

Football chants
"Moliendo Café" has become a popular chant for soccer fans around the world, and the chant is widely known as "Dale Cavese" in Europe. The chant was first adopted by fans of Boca Juniors a few years after Julio Iglesias had recorded the song, and it became popular in La Bombonera for a few decades, where the fans know the chant as "Dale Boca" ("Come on Boca"). The chant was picked up by fans of the Italian team Cavese 1919 after coming across a CD of Boca Juniors chants. The fans first used it in a match against Ancona in September 2006, and a clip of their chant "Dale Cavese" was uploaded to YouTube in 2007. The video went viral and its popularity then spread to other clubs around the world, with many fans adapting the chants for their own teams.

References

External links

  Chant by fans of Cavese

1958 songs
1961 singles
Venezuelan songs
Spanish-language songs
Ricardo Montaner songs
Songs written by Hugo Blanco (musician)
Number-one singles in Argentina
Number-one singles in Japan
Polydor Records singles